Gostinskaya is a rural locality (a village) in Razinskoye Rural Settlement, Kharovsky District, Vologda Oblast, Russia. The population was 10 as of 2002.

Geography 
Gostinskaya is located 41 km of from Kharovsk (the district's administrative centre) by road. Larionikha is the nearest rural locality.

References 

Rural localities in Kharovsky District